Karhaḍe Brahmins (also spelled as Karada Brahmins or Karad Brahmins) are a Hindu Brahmin sub-caste mainly from the Indian state of Maharashtra, but are also distributed in states of Goa, Karnataka and Madhya Pradesh.

Classification
Along with the Deshastha and Konkanastha Brahmins, the Karhade Brahmins are referred to as Maharashtrian Brahmins.

Based on Veda and Vedanta
Karhade Brahmins are essentially Rigvedi Brahmins who follow the Ashwalayana Sutra and belong to Shakala Shakha. Karhade Brahmins are divided into two groups based on the Vedanta they follow, the first of which follows the Advaita Vedanta of Adi Shankara  and the second of which follows the Dvaita Vedanta of Madhvacharya. Hence, Karhade Brahmins have both Smarthas and Madhvas (also known as Bhagvats or Vaishnavas) among them. Like their Deshastha counterparts, traditionally the karhade allowed cross-cousin marriages.

Sub-division and other claims
There are three divisions of Karhade Brahmins - Karhade (from Desh), Padye and Bhatt Prabhu (from Konkan). "Padhye" was a further division of "Padye" - and were Khots or farmers. There are three sub-castes in Karhade Brahmans 1. Karhade 2. Padye and 3. Bhatt Prabhu. Padyes were found mostly in Ambuj province of Konkan . According to author Pran Nath Chopra, The Karhade Brahmins who were appointed as the priests came to be called as "Upadhyayas" which in due course became Padhye.

Origin
The Karhade Brahmins take their name from the town of Karad in Satara district, the sacred junction of the Koina and Krishna. They migrated to the region between Malvan and Sangameshwar near the Konkan coast and made it their homeland. The Karhade section, though it takes its name from Karad, a place in the Deccan region, is found chiefly in the Konkan coast. Author Sandhya Gokhale says, "Karhade Brahmins are generally thought to be a branch of the Deshastha Rigvedis who immigrated from their home in Satara district to the southern part of Ratnagiri on the Konkan Coast, where they were principally settled".

Demographics 
Most Karhade Brahmins live in Maharashtra though a significant population exist in Goa, Karnataka, and cities outside Maharashtra such as  Sagar and Indore, Gwalior and Jabalpur in present day state of Madhya Pradesh. Ancestors of these people moved to these places during 18th century during the Maratha empire period. A southern branch of the Karhade Brahmins settled around the Udupi - Mangalore - Kasargod region of the Malabar coast and they are called the "Karada Brahmins" and share their traditions with Kerala Brahmins and the Brahmins of South Karnataka.

Culture

Occupation
Traditionally, the Karhade Brahmins were a community of priests who offered religious services in Hindu temple and to other communities.

Language
Marathi is the mother tongue of most of the Karhade Brahmins in Maharashtra.

Diet
Karhade Brahmins generally follow a vegetarian diet.

Notable people 
Moropant Ramachandra Paradkar (1729–1794), Marathi poet who was the last among those classified by Marathi literary scholars as pandit (पंडित) poets.
Balshastri Jambhekar (1810-1846), journalist and founder of Darpan, the first newspaper in the Marathi language.
Govind Ballal Kher (Govind Pant Bundela) (1710 - 1760), general and trustee of Peshwa Bajirao I 's territories in Bundelkhand.
Rani Lakshmibai of Jhansi (1828-1858), one of the leaders of the Indian Rebellion of 1857.
The Newalkars - military leaders under the Peshwa and later rulers of Jhansi.
Govind Sakharam Sardesai (1865–1959), historian.
Bhaskar Ramchandra Tambe (1874–1941), Marathi-language poet.
Govind Ballabh Pant (10 September 1887 – 7 March 1961), Indian freedom fighter, one of the architects of modern India and first Chief Minister of Uttar Pradesh. Recipient of Bharat Ratna. His ancestors migrated from the coastal Konkan region centuries ago to Kumaon region in present day Uttarakhand state. 
B. G. Kher (1888-1957), first Chief Minister of Bombay Presidency.
Laxmanrao Kirloskar (1869 – 1956) was an Indian businessman. He is the founder of the Kirloskar Group.
Shantanurao Laxmanrao Kirloskar (1903-1991), Kirloskar Group son of noted industrialist Laxmanrao Kirloskar.
M. S. Golwalkar (1906-1973), Sarsanghachalak of the Hindu nationalist Rashtriya Swayamsevak Sangh.
Jitendra Abhisheki (1929-1997) was an Indian vocalist, composer and scholar of Indian classical, semi-classical, and devotional music for in a Padye Karhade Brahmin family. While he distinguished himself in Hindustani music, he is also credited for the revival of the Marathi musical theatre in the 1960s.
Balipa Narayana Bhagavatha (1938-2023) was an Yakshagana Bhagavatha (Singer), who performed the Southern style of the art form called "Thenkuthittu". He is regarded to be one of the few bhagavathas who have maintained the original aesthetics of Thenkuthittu Yakshagana singing.

See also
Deshastha Brahmin
Chitpawan Brahmin
Marathi people
The Karhaadaa Website

References

Bibliography

Brahmin communities of Maharashtra
Indian surnames